The angry black woman stereotype is a racial trope in American society and media that portrays Black American women as inherently ill-mannered and ill-tempered. Related concepts are the "Sapphire" or "Jezebel".

Among stereotypes of groups within the United States, the angry black woman stereotype is less studied by researchers than the Mammy and Jezebel archetypes.

Carolyn West categorizes the Angry Black Woman (ABW) as a variation on the Sapphire stereotype or, colloquially, "Sistas with Attitude". She defines the pervasive Sapphire/ABW image as "a template for portraying almost all Black women" and as serving several purposes. West paraphrases Melissa V. Harris-Perry who contends, "...because [Angry Black Women's] passion and righteous indignation is often misread as irrational anger, this image can be used to silence and shame Black women who dare to challenge social inequalities, complain about their circumstances, or demand fair treatment".

Author and Professor of Law at Columbia University and at the University of California, Los Angeles Kimberlé Crenshaw defined and pioneered the analysis of the term "intersectionality" which describes this dual conflict experienced by black women specifically. In her Ted Talk, Crenshaw explains that black people experience a unique discrimination from white people, and women experience a unique discrimination from men. Black women, consequently, experience a unique form of discrimination from black men and white women and cannot only be judged based on the singularities of race or gender.

Sapphire stereotype as source 
Sapphire is a term associated with the most dominant portrayals of Black women. According to the stereotype, Sapphires were perceived as malicious and stubborn, with an overbearing nature. Aside from being depicted as unnecessarily loud and violent, Sapphires were also known to have an insatiable desire for African-American men. The Sapphire is thought to be closely related to the Mammy, though instead of a comforting demeanor, she is far more sexualized. The Sapphire is often seen as abusive, possessing a strong need to dominate, and looking for opportunities to project her own unhappiness upon others. The Sapphire poses as a persistent nagger, complaining not in hopes of a solution, but rather because she herself is bitter.

Negative caricatures of Black women historically justified their exploitation. The Sapphire archetype painted enslaved women as impure, strong, masculine, dominant, and aggressive who drove their children and partners away. This archetype characterizes the Black woman as experiencing disappointment, displeasure, bitterness or rage because of her significant other. The term has also been generalized to refer to Black women who show extreme emotion. It was utilized as a means to prove oppression was not as imminent of an issue, if Whites accepted Black women who acted according to this caricature.

The sexuality of the Jezebel stereotype 
The Jezebel is a stereotype used to refer to fair-skinned, slimmer, and lighter-eyed Black women, becoming hyper-sexualized by America and its media soon after the Mammy trope began its decline. Similar to the Sapphire, this trope was used as a justification for the harassment and assaults against Black women, as this painted them as inherently tempestuous and beguiling. The Jezebel presents as a slave construct, depicting Black women as "promiscuous" and "lustful". During slavery, lighter skinned women were seen as more worthy concubines to wealthy slave owners, whereas darker skinned women were more worthy for harsher labor such as field work. The Jezebel constructed a harmful perception of Black women that heavily contributed to their sexual and economic exploitation.

Perpetuation and reproduction of the stereotype 
With roots in slavery, the sapphire archetype was further replicated in films, shows, and literature by the early 1930s. The negative portrayals of African Americans in television and film influences perceptions of them in real life. The reinforcement of the angry Black woman stereotype through media can lead to negative interpretations of Black women's self-expression. We see this replicated as well in film, through portraying African American women as far older in order to remove sympathy garnering characteristics from Black characters. Through these media and social platforms the stereotype was cultivated and sustained.

Black women were perceived to be loud, overly expressive, and generally negative and rude in nature. The 1930s radio show Amos 'n' Andy was particularly one of the first media outlets that reinforced the stereotype. In this production two white men voiced Black characters. Among those characters were Black women. The narrative of anger, assertiveness, and frequent emasculation was echoed with characters such as Aunt Esther from Sanford and Son and Pam from Martin. Towards the early 1970s, Blaxploitation became a prominent film genre, capitalizing off of a new trope which emerged from the combination of two previous caricatures- Jezebel and Sapphire. This combination birthed a separate caricatures that took the overly sexual and aggressive perception of Black women and use it to fight crime. The Angry Black Woman was reinvented, as actresses were able use their "bodies, brains, and guns" to play as a seductress fighting crime. Actresses such as Pam Grier profited off of this genre, using her debut in Blaxploitation films to advance her career.

The pervasiveness of the angry Black woman stereotype has led many Black women to feel unable express themselves in fear of being perceived as angry. Although often labelled as "angry" unnecessarily, Black women's anger is also characterized as unjustified in instances in which anger is warranted. Deeming Black women's anger invalid or inappropriate shifts the focus from the cause of the anger to the reaction itself. This may be a conscious or subconscious action on behalf of the individual(s) labeling a Black woman as angry in order to shift blame or responsibility.

Relationships to other stereotypes 
The sapphire archetype coincides with the mammy and Jezebel. All three of these archetypes uphold the angry black woman stereotype, but in different ways. In the archetype of mammy, black women were characterized as caregivers and submissive, while the Jezebel is characterized as dependent on men, promiscuous, aggressive, and arrogant. The reproduction of these archetypes in popular culture legitimized the dehumanization of black women.

Gender studies professor Deborah Gray White writes, "slave women understood the value of silence and secrecy... like all who are dependent upon the caprices of a master, they hide their real sentiments and turn toward him changeless smile or enigmatic passivity". In other words, slavery poses a direct correlation to the Black women's emotional response, being taught that a domineering personality could be viewed as threatening.

Black feminist response 
Black women have used various platforms and mediums to fight back against the Angry Black Women trope that has contributed to their marginalization for centuries. A number of Black women provide insight on how the stereotype is reinforced in the media, social spaces, and interpersonal interactions. Furthermore, Black women, whether if it's through activism, academia, art, or dance, affirm their rage. Through such activism and discourse, Black women have opened many conversations regarding the dismissal and scrutiny of their emotions.

Black feminists have discredited the trope of the angry Black woman and recognize the validity in a black woman's anger. Black women are demanding a more accurate representation in the media overall in order to further the progression of the Black woman. Black feminists believe that the positive aspects of a Black woman's experience should be depicted in the media as well to hinder the persistence of this stereotype.

Portrayals 

The aftermath of slavery not only resulted in many social, economic and political effects but also led to the delineation of negative racial stereotypes in the portrayal of black women in media. The industry sometimes showed the stereotypical ideas of black women from mammies to sapphires, portraying black women as people who are unnecessarily aggressive and obnoxious. Many media outlets portray black women as aggressive and use black women in television as a comedic relief. Black women view this differently. As in various films, lead black women actresses are consistently depicted as angry and start an argument as black men are portrayed in a positive manner. Black women are often portrayed as an aggressive convict and a poor single mother with a lack of higher education. This stereotype has changed over time, however, the media still depicts black women in a negative perception.

Feminists believe that this is still extremely prevalent today, while non-feminists assert that there is a wide variety of black characters in all forms of media today, including both stereotypes and stereotype-free characters. Both groups do note that the "angry black woman" is one of the types of characters that is sometimes portrayed. It's been difficult to be a black women without not being angry after generations of oppression, discrimination and erasure. Black women aren't allowed to express frustration and passions without being criticized and demonized. They are labeled as loud, vindictive and always in trouble as men are allowed to get upset without constructive criticism because it can establish their masculinity. The strong black women myth often does well in movies and TV shows, but has contributed to making black women look miserable and nonproductive as opposed to other groups/races in reality.

Examples of modern movies containing one or more "angry black woman" character include the Madea series of movies, the TV show Empire, and others: 
Sapphire, from Amos 'n' Andy
 Aunt Esther, a character in Sanford and Son
 Wilhelmina Slater, a character in Ugly Betty

Public health 
In regards to culturally relevant practices during mental health treatment, Ashley W, author of The angry black woman: the impact of pejorative stereotypes on psychotherapy with black women. describes "the myth of the angry Black woman that characterizes these women as aggressive, ill tempered, illogical, overbearing, hostile, and ignorant without provocation" as a negative stereotype that victimizes black women.

Black women are expected to appear strong-willed and self-sacrificing in their daily lives, regardless of the traumas they experience due to being a Black women in a dominant society. The tropes used to label black women can have lasting effects, both mental and physical. The overabundance of stress that accompanies the racial and gender based discrimination can manifest into legitimate health issues such as anxiety, depression, and high blood pressure. The exposure to institutionalized racism over for an extensive period can lead to an increase in physiological stressors, which can lead to cardiovascular disorders and diseases. Chronic stress can lead to further health effects affiliating with racial discrimination.

Researchers have found effective coping strategies to combat the everlasting effects of racism, such as relying heavily on spirituality and placing their belief in a non-material and non-observational being. Vernessa R. Clark, author of The Perilous Effects of Racism on Blacks, notes that there are numerous coping styles that can be both effective or ineffective, but each consists of simultaneously accepting the effects of racism while denying the White institutions and productions that promote racism.

See also 

 Angry white man
 Black Buck
 Black feminism
 Cholo
 Criminal stereotype of African Americans
 Diary of a Tired Black Man
 Double bind
 Dragon Lady
 Fiery Latina and the hot señorita
 Karen (slang)
 Stereotypes of African Americans
 White Fragility

References

Citations

General sources 
 Ashley W. The angry black woman: the impact of pejorative stereotypes on psychotherapy with black women. Soc Work Public Health. 2014;29(1):27-34. doi: 10.1080/19371918.2011.619449. PMID 24188294.
 
 
 Crenshaw, Kimberlé. “The Urgency of Intersectionality.” Kimberlé Crenshaw: The Urgency of Intersectionality | TED Talk, TEDWomen, 2016,
 
 Ferris State University. (2022). The sapphire caricature. Jim Crow Museum  . Retrieved December 7, 2022, from https://www.ferris.edu/HTMLS/news/jimcrow/antiblack/sapphire.htm
 McLean, Y. (2021, February 14). 'Jezebel' is one of three common racial slurs against all black women and girls. Baptist News Global. Retrieved December 7, 2022, from https://baptistnews.com/article/jezebel-is-one-of-three-common-racial-slurs-against-all-black-women-and-girls/#.Y5AabezMKhY
 
 
 
 
 
 
 
Pilgrim, David. “The Jezebel Stereotype.” Ferris State University, July 2002
 Rosenthal, Lisa; Lobel, Marci (2016-9). "Stereotypes of Black American Women Related to Sexuality and Motherhood". Psychology of women quarterly. 40 (3): 414–427. doi:10.1177/0361684315627459. ISSN 0361-6843. PMC 5096656. PMID 27821904.

External links
 "Ain't I a Woman" (video), Kai Davis Poetry

African-American gender relations
Slang terms for women
Stereotypes of African Americans
Stereotypes of black women
Female stock characters